Gingidia is a genus of flowering plants belonging to the family Apiaceae.

Its native range is Southeastern Australia, New Zealand.

Species:

Gingidia algens 
Gingidia amphistoma 
Gingidia baxteri 
Gingidia decipiens 
Gingidia enysii 
Gingidia flabellata 
Gingidia grisea 
Gingidia haematitica 
Gingidia harveyana 
Gingidia montana 
Gingidia rupicola 
Gingidia trifoliolata

References

Apioideae
Taxa named by John Dawson (botanist)
Apioideae genera